The 1990 Midland Group Championships was a women's tennis tournament played on indoor carpet courts at the Brighton Centre in Brighton, England that was part of the Tier II of the 1990 WTA Tour. It was the 13th edition of the tournament and was held from 23 October until 28 October 1990. First-seeded Steffi Graf won the singles title, her third consecutive at the event and fourth in total, and earned $70,000 first-prize money.

Finals

Singles
 Steffi Graf defeated  Helena Suková 7–5, 6–3
 It was Graf's 9th singles title of the year and the 53rd of her career.

Doubles
 Helena Suková /  Nathalie Tauziat defeated  Jo Durie /  Natasha Zvereva 6–1, 6–4

References

External links
 International Tennis Federation (ITF) tournament event details
 Tournament draws

Midland Bank Tennis Championships
Brighton International
Midland Bank Tennis Championships
Midland Bank Tennis Championships
Midland